The Bravery Medal (BM) is a bravery decoration awarded to Australians. It is awarded for acts of bravery in hazardous circumstances. The BM was created in February 1975. The decorations recognise acts of bravery by members of the community. They selflessly put themselves in jeopardy to protect the lives or property of others. It is ranked third of the Australian bravery decorations in the Australian Honours System. Recipients of the Bravery Medal are entitled to use the post-nominal letters "BM".

Design

Medal
The Bravery Medal is a circular bronze medal ensigned with the Crown of Saint Edward. It is surmounted with the shield and crest of the Commonwealth Coat of Arms. The Federation Star is above the shield, which is contained in a circular zig-zag border.

Bar and ribbon
The medal is suspended from a ribbon by a bar inscribed "For Bravery". The ribbon is 32 mm wide and has 15 alternating stripes of blood-red and magenta representing the colours of venous and arterial blood.

Recipients

As of November 2016, the Australian Government "It's an Honour" database contains 1,240 entries of people who have been awarded the medal.

See also
Australian Honours Order of Precedence

References

Civil awards and decorations of Australia
Courage awards
1975 establishments in Australia
Awards established in 1975